The Point Bridge was a steel cantilever truss bridge that spanned the Monongahela River in Pittsburgh, Pennsylvania.

History

Point Bridge I

In 1877, a suspension bridge called the Point Bridge was built over the Monongahela River, and is retroactively referred to as Point Bridge I by locals since being replaced by the second Point Bridge, which is sometimes called "Point Bridge II".

Point Bridge II
The bridge was constructed from 1925 to 1927 and was opened to traffic on 20 June 1927.  Dismantling of the old Point Bridge began that following August, and on October 9 the span was brought down into the Monongahela River by cutting the last cables holding it in place.

The new Point Bridge was constructed by the Fort Pitt Bridge Works of Canonsburg, Pennsylvania and was situated closer to the point than its Allegheny River counterpart, the Manchester Bridge.  Its north end landed roughly where the plaza around the Point State Park fountain begins, and its south end landed less than a tenth of a mile east of the Duquesne Incline.  The bridge passed over an elevated span above the Point to connect the two bridges.

The Point Bridge II was closed to traffic on June 21, 1959, two days after the dedication and grand opening of the Fort Pitt Bridge.  It remained standing until demolition began on April 15, 1970 and was completed that following November.  The south landing remains, partly shrouded by trees, between West Station Square Drive and West Carson Street.  In 2008, a headstone marking the duration of the bridge's construction was found abandoned on the hillside across from the old south landing; it is now on display at nearby Station Square.

See also
Manchester Bridge (Pittsburgh)
Fort Pitt Bridge
 List of bridges documented by the Historic American Engineering Record in Pennsylvania
List of crossings of the Monongahela River

References

External links
 (second bridge)

Bridges in Pittsburgh
Bridges over the Monongahela River
Demolished bridges in the United States
Road bridges in Pennsylvania
Historic American Engineering Record in Pennsylvania
Steel bridges in the United States
Cantilever bridges in the United States
Truss bridges in the United States